Thiseio, also known as Thissio on signage, is one of the oldest stations in Athens Athens Metro Line 1, located in Thiseio at  from Piraeus. It is located in Athens and took its name from the nearby Temple of Hephaestus which is famous as Thiseio.  The station was first opened on 27 February 1869 and was renovated in 2004. It has two platforms.

Thissio station is the first railway station in the city of Athens, other than the Thissio–Piraeus of today's line 1 of Athens metro and the first railway line other than the range of the Greek government. The station was the furthermost on 17 May 1895, at the time the line ended to Omonoia.

References

Athens Metro stations
Railway stations opened in 1869
1869 establishments in Greece